北海, meaning "North Sea" in Chinese and Japanese, may refer to:

 Hokkaido (北海道), one of the main islands of Japan.
 Beihai Park (北海公园/北海公園), a well-known park in Beijing
 Beihai City (北海市), a prefecture-level city in Guangxi lying on the Gulf of Tonkin
 Lake Baikal (北海), a Siberian lake north of Outer Mongolia
 North Sea (北海((大西洋))), a marginal sea of the Atlantic Ocean located between Great Britain, Scandinavia, Germany, the Netherlands, Belgium, and France
 County, North sea (北海郡)，an administrative division during the Western Han period.